Tansila  is a department or commune of Banwa Province in western Burkina Faso. Its capital lies at the town of Tansila. According to the 1996 census the department has a total population of 27,714.

Towns and villages
The largest towns and villages and populations in the department are as follows:
 Tansila	(3 876 inhabitants) (capital)
 Ben	(901 inhabitants)
 Bouan	(682 inhabitants)
 Darsalam	(1 107 inhabitants)
 Douma	(1 154 inhabitants)
 Driko	(1 050 inhabitants)
 Faso-benkadi	(917 inhabitants)
 Féléwé	(144 inhabitants)
 Gui	(660 inhabitants)
 Kéllé	(1 343 inhabitants)
 Kira	(671 inhabitants)
 Kokouna	(1 385 inhabitants)
 Korani	(767 inhabitants)
 Kouneni	(1 128 inhabitants)
 Moara	(875 inhabitants)
 Nangouna	(1 483 inhabitants)
 Ouléni	(326 inhabitants)
 Ouorowé	(2 479 inhabitants)
 Tamouga	(560 inhabitants)
 Thy	(435 inhabitants)
 Tillé	(718 inhabitants)
 Toma	(1 459 inhabitants)
 Toma Koura	(150 inhabitants)
 Toula	(1 407 inhabitants)
 Toungo	(1 350 inhabitants)
 Triko	(687 inhabitants)

References

Departments of Burkina Faso
Banwa Province